Brđani is a Serbo-Croatian toponym, meaning "Highlanders". It may refer to:

 Brđani, Brus, village in Serbia
 Brđani, Gornji Milanovac, village in Serbia
 Brđani, Novi Pazar, village in Serbia
 Brđani, Ripanj, borough of Belgrade, Serbia
 Brđani, Konjic, village in Bosnia and Herzegovina
 Brđani, Tuzla, a village in Bosnia and Herzegovina
 Brđani, Požega-Slavonia County, village in Croatia
 Brđani, Brod-Posavina County, village near Rešetari, Croatia
 Brđani Cesta, village in Croatia
 Brđani Sokolovački, near Sokolovac, Croatia

See also
 Brda, Montenegro, a historical tribal region, also known as Brđani

Serbo-Croatian place names